The Hummingbird Medal is a state decoration of Trinidad and Tobago, instituted in 1969. The medal is awarded for loyal and devoted service beneficial to the state in any field, or acts of conspicuous gallantry or other outstanding humane action. There are three grades to the medal: bronze, silver and gold. Recipients of the medal are entitled to designate their names with the post-nominal letters "HBM".

Recipients

References

 
Orders, decorations, and medals of Trinidad and Tobago
Awards established in 1969
1969 establishments in Trinidad and Tobago